The 2016 Poprad-Tatry ATP Challenger Tour was a professional tennis tournament played on clay courts. It was the second edition of the tournament which was part of the 2016 ATP Challenger Tour. It took place in Poprad, Slovakia between 13 and 18 June 2016.

Singles main-draw entrants

Seeds

 1 Rankings are as of June 6, 2016.

Other entrants
The following players received wildcards into the singles main draw:
  Patrik Fabian
  Lukáš Klein
  Martin Kližan 
  Dominik Šproch

The following player received entry into the singles main draw as a special exempt:
  Emilio Gómez

The following players received entry from the qualifying draw:
  Maximilian Marterer
  Nikola Mektić
  Jan Mertl
  Vitaliy Sachko

The following players received entry as a lucky loser:
  Dragoș Dima

Champions

Singles

  Horacio Zeballos def.  Gerald Melzer, 6–3, 6–4

Doubles

  Ariel Behar /  Andrey Golubev def.  Lukáš Dlouhý /  Andrej Martin, 6–2, 5–7, [10–5]

External links
Official Website

Poprad-Tatry ATP Challenger Tour
Poprad-Tatry ATP Challenger Tour
Pop